Kirkby is a town in the Metropolitan Borough of Knowsley, Merseyside, England.  It contains 15 buildings that are recorded in the National Heritage List for England as designated listed buildings. Of these, one is listed at  Grade II*, the middle of the three grades, and the others are at Grade II, the lowest grade.

Until the Second World War, Kirkby was a small community. It then became a place to house people from Liverpool moved by slum clearance. All the listed buildings date from before this time, and consist of a church, houses and associated structures, two public houses, and a war memorial.

Key

Buildings

References

Citations

Sources

Listed buildings in Merseyside
Lists of listed buildings in Merseyside